Haputale is a town in Sri Lanka. Haputale may also refer to the following villages in Sri Lanka
Haputale Pallegama
Haputale Udagama